Jeffrey Allen Thompson (born November 22, 1961) is an American artistic gymnastics coach. Coaching for thirty years, he has worked extensively on the NCAA collegiate scene but has also worked within club gymnastics. After holding assistant coach positions at Wisconsin-Madison, Illinois and Louisiana State for ten years, Thompson was appointed the head coach of the Auburn Tigers women's gymnastics program for the incoming 2000 season. He spent eleven seasons at Auburn, leading the Tigers to seven consecutive NCAA Regional appearances.

References

1961 births
Living people
People from Fort Thomas, Kentucky
University of Kentucky alumni